A "Hello, World!" program generally is a computer program that outputs or displays the message "Hello, World!".

Hello World may also refer to:

Music
"Hello World!" (composition), song by the Iamus computer
"Hello World" (Tremeloes song), 1969
"Hello World" (Lady Antebellum song), 2010
"Hello World", a song by Nik Kershaw from the album To Be Frank
"Hello, World!", a 2015 song by Bump of Chicken
"Hello World", a 2015 song by Ginny Blackmore
"Hello World", a song by Belle Perez
"Hello World", a song by Louie Zong using the Myriad virtual singer program
"Hello, World!", a 2018 song by Vocaloid producer YZYX featuring Hatsune Miku
"Hello World", a 2022 song by Alan Walker featuring Torine

Albums
Hello World, 2011 album by Back-On
Hello World (Information Society album), 2014
Hello World (Scandal album), 2014
Hello, World! (EP), 2022 EP by Xdinary Heroes
Hello World: The Motown Solo Collection, compilation album by Michael Jackson

Other uses
Helloworld Travel, an Australian-based travel agency
Helloworld (TV program), an Australian travel and lifestyle television program
Hello World (film), a 2019 Japanese animated film
Hello World (Web Series), a 2022 Telugu TV Series
Hello World: How to Be Human in the Age of the Machine, a book by Hannah Fry